McKinley Peak is a peak standing  west of Hershey Ridge at the south end of the Ford Ranges in Marie Byrd Land, Antarctica. It was discovered on the Byrd Antarctic Expedition flight of December 5, 1929, and named by Richard E. Byrd for Grace McKinley, wife of Captain Ashley C. McKinley, aerial photographer and third-in-command of the expedition.

References

Mountains of Marie Byrd Land